Robert Healy is the name of:

Rob Healy (Robert P. Healy; born 1964), private equity professional, military officer and American football player
Robert Healy (commissioner) (died 1871), Chicago official
Robert Healy (journalist) (1925–2010), American political correspondent
Robert W. Healy (born 1943), Cambridge, Massachusetts city manager
Robert E. Healy (1883–1946), Vermont attorney and judge

See also
Robert Healey (disambiguation)